Paulo Fernando Serafín Callejas (born 20 April 1975) is a Mexican former professional footballer.

References

1975 births
Living people
Footballers from Mexico City
Mexican footballers
Association football fullbacks
Club Puebla players
Alacranes de Durango footballers
C.F. Monterrey players
Atlante F.C. footballers